Kukushkino is a rural locality (a village) in Pekshinskoye Rural Settlement, Petushinsky District, Vladimir Oblast, Russia. The population was 26 as of 2010. There are 5 streets.

Geography 
Kukushkino is located 20 km east of Petushki (the district's administrative centre) by road. Kosteryovo is the nearest rural locality.

References 

Rural localities in Petushinsky District